Dhruvasangamam is a 1981 Indian Malayalam-language drama film directed by J. Sasikumar and written by S. L. Puram Sadanandan from a story by Jessie Rasquinha who also produced the film. It stars Sukumaran, Shubha, Mohanlal, K. P. Ummer, and Manavalan Joseph. The film features songs composed by Raveendran and background score by Guna Singh.

Plot

Cast
Sukumaran as Chandramohan
Shubha as Rajalakshmi
Mohanlal as Shankarankutty
K. P. Ummer as Krishnadas
Manavalan Joseph as Lambodhara Panikkar
Alummoodan as Madhavapilla
Kuthiravattam Pappu as Padma
Meena as Doctor
Reena as Valsala

Soundtrack
The songs were composed by Raveendran and the lyrics were written by Sathyan Anthikkad.

References

External links
 

1981 films
1980s Malayalam-language films
Indian thriller drama films
Malayalam remakes of Hindi films
1981 action films